Zakaria Naidji (born 19 January 1995) is an Algerian professional footballer who plays for  club Laval, on loan from Algerian Ligue Professionnelle 1 club Paradou AC. He played one match for the Algeria national team in 2019.

Club career
Naidji was the top scorer of the 2018–19 Algerian Ligue Professionnelle 1 with 20 goals. Across all competitions, he scored a total of 21 goals and made seven assists during the season.

In August 2019, Naidji joined Portuguese liga NOS club Gil Vicente on loan from Paradou AC. It was reported Gil Vicente paid €50,000 for the loan and also secured an option to sign him permanently for €1.4 million.In March 2021, Naidji joined USM Alger on loan from Paradou AC.In September 2021, he joined Pau FC on loan from Paradou AC.In July 2021, Naidji joined Laval on loan from Paradou AC.

International career
Naidji made his Algeria national football team debut on 22 March 2019 in an African Cup of Nations qualifier against Gambia, as a 64th-minute substitute for Oussama Darfalou.

Career statistics

Club

Honours
 Algerian Ligue Professionnelle 1 top scorer: 2018–19

References

External links

Living people
1995 births
Association football forwards
Algerian footballers
Algeria international footballers
Algerian Ligue Professionnelle 1 players
Primeira Liga players
Paradou AC players
Gil Vicente F.C. players
Pau FC players
Stade Lavallois players
Algerian expatriate footballers
Expatriate footballers in Portugal
Algerian expatriate sportspeople in Portugal
Expatriate footballers in France
Algerian expatriate sportspeople in France
21st-century Algerian people